Broken April is a novel by Albanian author Ismail Kadare. Published in 1978, the book explores one of Kadare's recurring themes: how the past affects the present. The novel concerns about the centuries-old tradition of hospitality, blood feuds, and revenge killing in the highlands of north Albania in the 1930s.

Plot

Gjorg Berisha, a 26-year-old Albanian man living on the country's high plateau, is forced to commit a murder under the laws of the Kanun to avenge his brother. As a result of this killing, his own death is sealed; he is to be killed by a member of the opposing family.

The novel concerns about the centuries-old tradition of hospitality, blood feuds, and revenge killing in the highlands of north Albania in the 1930s.

Reading "Broken April" it is easy to understand why and with what strength Ismail Kadare is passionate about tragedy and its two most prominent representatives, Shakespeare and Aeschylus. "Friendship, loyalty, and feud are the wheels of the mechanism of ancient tragedy, and to enter into their mechanism is to see the possibility of tragedy."

Reception
Broken April was lauded by reviewers upon its release. The New York Times, reviewing it, wrote: "Broken April is written with masterly simplicity in a bardic style, as if the author is saying: Sit quietly and let me recite a terrible story about a blood feud and the inevitability of death by gunfire in my country. You know it must happen because that is the way life is lived in these mountains. Insults must be avenged; family honor must be upheld...." The Wall Street Journal declared Kadare "one of the most compelling novelists now writing in any language."
Reading "Broken April" it is easy to understand why and with what strength Ismail Kadare is passionate about tragedy and its two most prominent representatives, Shakespeare and Aeschylus. "Friendship, loyalty, and feud are the wheels of the mechanism of ancient tragedy, and to enter into their mechanism is to see the possibility of tragedy."

Adaptations 
In 2001, a movie adaptation of Broken April, called Behind the Sun (Abril Despedaçado), was filmed in Brazil. It was made by filmmaker Walter Salles, set in 1910 Brazil and starring Rodrigo Santoro, and was nominated for a BAFTA Award for Best Film Not in the English Language and a Golden Globe Award for Best Foreign Language Film.

Footnotes

1978 novels
20th-century Albanian novels
Albanian novels adapted into films
Novels by Ismail Kadare
Novels set in Albania
Novels set in the 1930s